Arisaema speciosum is a species of flowering plant in the family Araceae, native to Nepal, East Himalaya, Assam, Tibet and south-central China.

References

Flora of Nepal
Flora of East Himalaya
Flora of Assam (region)
Flora of Tibet
Flora of South-Central China
speciosum